Edna Marion (born Edna Marion Hannam; December 12, 1906 – December 2, 1957) was a silent motion picture actress who appeared in a number of Hal Roach short comedies.

Career
Marion's career at the Hal Roach Studies ended abruptly on April 7, 1928, after being employed since April 25, 1927. She also worked for Century, Paramount, and Universal studios.

In 1926, Marion was named one of the WAMPAS Baby Stars, along with Mary Astor, Mary Brian, Dolores Costello, Joan Crawford, Dolores del Río, Janet Gaynor, and Fay Wray.

Death 
Marion's death certificate states she was a housewife when she died in Los Angeles from pneumonia, and her husband was Harold Naisbitt. She is buried at Holy-Cross Cemetery, in Los Angeles, California.

Filmography

References

External links

1906 births
1957 deaths
American film actresses
American silent film actresses
Actresses from Chicago
20th-century American actresses
Hal Roach Studios actors
WAMPAS Baby Stars